Moonlight Follies is a 1921 American silent comedy film directed by King Baggot and starring Marie Prevost, Lionel Belmore and Marie Crisp.

Cast
 Marie Prevost as Nan Rutledge 
 Lionel Belmore as James Rutledge 
 Marie Crisp as Cissie Hallock 
 George Fisher as Rene Smythe 
 Clyde Fillmore as Tony Griswold

References

Bibliography
 Munden, Kenneth White. The American Film Institute Catalog of Motion Pictures Produced in the United States, Part 1. University of California Press, 1997.

External links
 

1921 films
1921 comedy films
1920s English-language films
American silent feature films
Silent American comedy films
Films directed by King Baggot
American black-and-white films
Universal Pictures films
1920s American films